Bot Sentinel is a Twitter analytics service founded in 2018 by Christopher Bouzy. It tracks disinformation, inauthentic behavior and targeted harassment on Twitter.

History 
According to his LinkedIn page, Christopher Bouzy started out as a computer service technician, and founded several firms prior to setting up Bot Sentinel, including Egisca Corporation, the parent company of the dating website IfSolo.com. In the 2000s, Bouzy developed the encryption software Cloak, which Avanquest Software acquired in 2006. Bouzy then developed Nexus Radio, a free platform for recording and playing back radio streams, which was later acquired by an investment group.

Around 2016, Bouzy started teaching himself about machine learning algorithms. He founded Bot Sentinel in 2018, being inspired to do so due to the Russian interference in the 2016 United States elections. 

In August 2022, Twitter said it would revoke Bot Sentinel's access to its APIs, saying that Bot Sentinel's tracker activity was in violation of its API policies. At the time, Twitter was in a legal dispute with Elon Musk over his acquisition of the platform.

In October 2022, attorney Nathaniel Broughty, who runs an anti-Amber Heard YouTube channel named NateTheLawyer, filed a lawsuit in Hudson County Superior Court in New Jersey, claiming that he had been incorrectly flagged by Bot Sentinel as well as targeted for defamation by Bouzy.

In December 2022, Bot Sentinel announced that it would be launching a beta version of Spoutible, a Twitter-like social media platform, in January 2023. The launch occurred on February 1, 2023, with nearly 150,000 users applying for pre-registration.

Founder 
Bouzy was born on May 22, 1975. He grew up in New York City in what he described as a lower middle class upbringing, with his mother, a single parent. They shared a residence with his grandmother, two aunts and two cousins. Bouzy started coding on a Mattel Aquarius computer his mother bought him when he was 9 years old.

Bouzy lives in New York, and is married, with a daughter. Bouzy and his family have received harassment due to his work on Bot Sentinel. His mother died in 2021 after being infected with COVID-19 while dealing with cancer; Bouzy said she was afraid to take the COVID-19 vaccine because "she had just heard so many different things [online]", and has cited her memory as part of the reason for being proactive with getting Twitter and other platforms to remove misinformation from their platforms.

Investigations 
Prior to the 2020 United States presidential election, Bouzy said that inauthentic Twitter accounts were promoting false or unverified claims of voter fraud, or advancing then-President Donald Trump's unfounded claims of impropriety in the counting of ballots.

In October 2021, Bot Sentinel released their analysis of more than 114,000 tweets about Prince Harry and Meghan, the Duke and Duchess of Sussex, as a result of which they found 83 accounts with a combined number of 187,631 followers that were possibly responsible for approximately 70 percent of the negative content posted about the couple. The report prompted an investigation by Twitter. The company stated that it found no evidence of "widespread coordination" between the accounts, and said that it had taken action against users who violated Twitter's conduct policy. Bouzy was himself responsible for initiating a discourse on Twitter that criticized Harry's brother and sister-in-law Prince William and Catherine, the Prince and Princess of Wales, for their appearance by tweeting that they were "aging in Banana years".

A January 2022 Bot Sentinel report said that online hate campaigns targeting Harry and Meghan had become a "cottage industry" for a few online influencers exclusively posting about the couple. The report described it as "a lucrative hate-for-profit enterprise" where "racism and YouTube ad revenue are the primary motivators", and described the conspiracy theories the influencers promoted about Harry and Meghan as being reminiscent of the QAnon conspiracy theory.

Bouzy has also conducted paid-for private research for the legal team of Amber Heard as well as unpaid research on bot attacks against public figures such as Heard, Meghan Markle, Pete Buttigieg and Lisa Page.

Operation 
Bot Sentinel relies on machine learning to identify Twitter bots, using millions of tweets from suspended accounts that are categorized as being either bots or not bots. The service is trained to identify what Bouzy calls "problematic accounts". Its algorithm gives Twitter accounts a score between 0% and 100%, which is based on their resemblance to accounts that violate Twitter's rules.

As of October 2022, Bot Sentinel consisted of Bouzy and three programmers and data scientists. Bot Sentinel receives funding through donations on its website, which allows its browser extensions and hate trackers to be used free of charge by the general public.

References

External links 

 
 Spoutible

Internet properties established in 2018
Twitter services and applications
Fact-checking websites
Media analysis organizations and websites
Social network analysis software